The following is a list of Malayalam films released in the year 1977.

Dubbed films

References

 1977
1977
Malayalam
Fil